Carlo Barsotti was an Italian-American newspaper and bank owner. He was born in Pisa, Italy in 1850 and died in New Jersey, United States in 1927.

Biography
Barsotti emigrated from Italy to New York City in 1872. In 1879, he founded the Il Progresso Italo-Americano newspaper in New York City with Vincenzo Polidori, which soon became the city's largest-circulation foreign-language newspaper.

In 1882 he opened the Italian American Bank, with Carlo Pavia as his general manager.

King Umberto I of Italy rewarded him the distinction of the title Cavaliere  in 1888. With numerous awards from the country of Venezuela and the Italian Red Cross, he was a very notable Italian figure in late 19th century America.

Barsotti used his newspaper as a tool to raise funds for monuments to great Italian figures, which were disseminated all over New York City's parks. Examples of his funding efforts are Washington Square (Giuseppe Garibaldi), Battery Park (Giovanni Da Verrazzano), Verdi Square (Giuseppe Verdi) and Columbus Circle (Christopher Columbus).

See also
Dante Park

References

External links
  "That Statue of Dante in the Heart of Manhattan", by Tiziano Thomas Dossena, Bridgepugliausa.it, 2011
  “But for Columbus there would be no America”, by Tiziano Thomas Dossena, Bridgepugliausa.it, 2011

1850 births
1927 deaths
Italian emigrants to the United States
Publishers (people) of Italian-language newspapers in the United States
19th-century American businesspeople